Otto Jaksch (born May 17, 1992, in Öckerö) is a Swedish ice hockey defenceman. He is currently playing with Frölunda HC in the Elitserien.

References

External links

1992 births
Frölunda HC players
Living people
People from Öckerö Municipality
Swedish ice hockey defencemen
Sportspeople from Västra Götaland County